Savage Creek is a stream in the U.S. state of Georgia. It is a tributary to the Ocmulgee River.

Savage Creek received its name from an incident when white settlers were killed in a massacre perpetuated by Native Americans, pejoratively known as "savages".

References

Rivers of Georgia (U.S. state)
Rivers of Twiggs County, Georgia